Sigurðardóttir is a surname of Icelandic origin, meaning daughter of Sigurður. In Icelandic names, the name is not strictly a surname, but a patronymic. The name refers to:

Agnes M. Sigurðardóttir (b. 1954), Icelandic bishop
Jóhanna Sigurðardóttir (b. 1942), Icelandic politician, prime minister of Iceland from January 2009 until May 2012
Ragna Sigurðardóttir (b. 1962), Icelandic author and artist
Sigurlín Margrét Sigurðardóttir (b. 1964), Icelandic politician; first deaf person to be a member of the Alþing
Steinunn Sigurðardóttir (b. 1950), Icelandic author and poet
Yrsa Sigurðardóttir (b. 1963), Icelandic author of crime novels and children’s stories
Zuilma Gabriela Sigurðardóttir (b. 1962), Icelandic professor in psychology

See also
Sigurðsson

Sigurdadottir
Icelandic-language surnames